Great Longstone for Ashford railway station was a station which served Great and Little Longstone in the Peak District of Derbyshire. It was opened in 1863 by the Midland Railway on its extension of the Manchester, Buxton, Matlock and Midlands Junction Railway from Rowsley.

History
Originally known as Longstone railway station, in 1913 it was renamed Great Longstone for Ashford (Ashford-in-the-Water). Once the London, Midland and Scottish Railway reached Manchester the line carried expresses to London St Pancras and heavy mineral traffic.

It closed in 1962, except that one train a day in each direction continued to stop to allow a local resident, Mrs A Boardman, to travel to work, an episode immortalised by the British Movietone film It Only Stops For Her.. Trains continued to pass through the station until 1968 when the line was closed.

The station building, now Thornbridge Outdoors, was designed to match the nearby Thornbridge Hall and is Grade II listed, and the trackbed through the station is part of the  Monsal Trail, a walk and cycleway. Access to the Monsal Trail can be made at Great Longstone for Ashford railway station, via the ramp off Longstone Lane.

Stationmasters
From 1926 the stationmaster was also responsible for Hassop. In 1931 the stationmaster was no longer responsible for Hassop, but managed both Longstone and Monsal Dale.

Joseph Bell 1863–1868
Richard H. Bell until 1873
Richard Coe 1873–1906 (formerly station master at Monsal Dale)
Thomas Harlin 1907–1914 (afterwards station master at Heaton Mersey)
B. Wilson from 1914
T.A. Huddlestone until 1924 (afterwards station master at Ecclesfield)
F. Smith 1924–1926 (afterwards station master at Beauchief)
J. Townson 1926–1931 (also station master at Hassop afterwards station master at Duffield)
J.H. Adams 1944–1947 (afterwards station master at Radway Green)
Horace Gundry ca. 1948–ca. 1950

Route

See also
Listed buildings in Great Longstone

References

 Truman, P., Hunt, D., (1989) Midland Railway Portrait, Sheffield: Platform 5 Publishing
 Radford, B., (1988) Midland Though The Peak, Unicorn Books

External links
 Longstone station on navigable 1947 O. S. map

Railway stations in Great Britain opened in 1863
Railway stations in Great Britain closed in 1967
Disused railway stations in Derbyshire
Former Midland Railway stations
Grade II listed buildings in Derbyshire
1863 establishments in England
1967 disestablishments in England